The Intervention Brigade or BrigInt is an infantry brigade in service with the Portuguese Army. It was created in 2006 from the Light Intervention Brigade, which was itself the heir of the former Special Forces Brigade.

Organization 
The brigades operational units are listed below. Under the Portuguese system regiments are responsible for the training, maintenance and sustainment of the operational units, but are not operational units themselves. I.e. the 6th Cavalry Regiment trains, maintains and sustains the Intervention Brigade's Reconnaissance Group, but the regiment itself is not an operational unit and not part of the brigade during wartime.

 Intervention Brigade, in Coimbra
 Command and Command Support Service Company, in Coimbra
 Reconnaissance Group, 6th Cavalry Regiment (Regimento de Cavalaria Nº 6) in Braga, with Pandur II and Commando V150 armored vehicles
 1st Infantry Battalion, 13th Infantry Regiment (Regimento de Infantaria Nº 13), in Vila Real, with Pandur II armored personnel carriers
 2nd Infantry Battalion, 14th Infantry Regiment (Regimento de Infantaria Nº 14), in Viseu, with Pandur II armored personnel carriers
 Field Artillery Group, 5th Artillery Regiment (Regimento de Artilharia Nº 5), in Vendas Novas with M114 155mm howitzers
 Anti-aircraft Artillery Group, 1st Anti-Air Artillery Regiment (Regimento de Artilharia Anti-Aérea Nº 1) in Queluz with Stinger surface-to-air missiles
 Engineer Company, 3rd Engineer Regiment (Regimento de Engenharia Nº 3), in Espinho
 Signal Battalion, Signal Regiment (Regimento de Transmissoes), in Porto
 Permanent Medium Service Support Nucleus (NPApSvcMed), in Entroncamento

Equipment 
Infantry equipment:

 Glock 17 Gen 5
 FN SCAR-L STD
 FN SCAR-H STD
 FN Minimi Mk3
 Browning M2HB
 Benelli Supernova
 Tampella B
 mGrW 82
 Carl Gustav M3
 MILAN
 BGM-71 TOW
 M72A3 LAW
 FIM-92 Stinger

References

External links 
 Brigade official page

Brigades of Portugal
Military units and formations established in 2006
Military of Portugal